Central Hydraulic Tower is a Grade II listed building situated in Birkenhead, England. It was designed by J. B. Hartley to provide the necessary power to move the bridges and lock gates art the adjacent Birkenhead Docks. The building design was based on the Palazzo Vecchio town hall situated in the Piazza della Signoria, Florence, Italy. Currently disused, the building is planned to be used as a martine knowledge hub as part of the Wirral Waters development scheme.

History
During the Second World War the building and  tower were considerably damaged by aerial bombing but and were later repaired in a more functional instead of architectural style. The large lantern that was once situated at the top of the tower was not replaced. The building is now disused and in a dilapidated condition.

As part of the Wirral Waters development, a new plan for the site was completed in March 2008 for a £12 million redevelopment and restoration of the building by Peel Holdings for it to be converted into a restaurant and bar. A hotel complex with92 rooms was planned to be constructed immediately adjacent to it. These plans never came to fruition and in September 2015 it was announced that the tower would become part of a £30 million advanced manufacturing and engineering skills centre. Known as the 'Hydraulic Tower and Generator Project', owners Peel intend to create 90,000 square feet of space for offices and workspaces for small to medium fast-growing businesses. 

In March 2021, it was announced that the building would be brought back in to use as The Maritime Knowledge Hub and will be a national base for marine engineering research and development and survival training as well as providing business accelerator space for the maritime sector. The project will cost £23m. Planning permission was raised by Peel in June 2022, with work hoping to be started in mid-2023.

Description

Historic England describes the building as being 3 storeys, made of brick with rock-faced stone dressings. The boiler room was originally home to six boilers while two engines pumped steam through the system in another room.

See also
Listed buildings in Wallasey

References

Sources

Buildings and structures in Birkenhead
Grade II listed buildings in Merseyside
Buildings and structures completed in 1868